This is a list of monuments erected by the United Daughters of the Confederacy, as well as by the Ladies' Memorial Association, the Sons of Confederate Veterans, and other related groups. Some of the UDC monuments feature artworks by noted sculptors.

Alabama

Arkansas

Florida

Georgia

Kentucky

Louisiana

Mississippi

Missouri

Montana

North Carolina

Ohio

South Carolina

Tennessee

Texas

Virginia

Washington

This monument was toppled on the July 4, 2020 weekend, by persons unknown (as of July 6, 2020).

West Virginia

See also
 List of Confederate monuments and memorials, for a comprehensive list of monuments and memorials, places, schools, parks, streets, geographical features, and other objects named for the Confederacy or its members
 Removal of Confederate monuments and memorials, for those that have been removed

References

Sources

United Daughters of the Confederacy monuments and memorials